Living & Dying is a 2007 film starring Edward Furlong and Michael Madsen. The film was shot on location in Dallas and Fort Worth, Texas. It was released on DVD in the US on December 25, 2007. Living & Dying tells the story of two killers who turn the tables on a group of bank robbers after a botched heist.

Plot summary
Four people rob the vault of a bank at gunpoint. The only trouble is that a large armed police presence turns up as they try to drive away. They take shelter in a diner, where two psychos with guns, Max and Karl decide to take over, and have the (about) $500,000 for themselves.

The robbers become victims with the owners of the diner and the people who were eating there. At first Max and Karl let Sam, one of the robbers do all the talking to Det. Devlin, not letting on that they are there also. But then they decide to make demands as telephone negotiations are going nowhere and shoot one of the hostages in front of the police.

Lind, another negotiator has turned up and takes over, with a gung-ho attitude. A TV reporter is allowed in with a camera to film what they allow, but Max sees her hidden camera which is showing the police what is really going on there and for that she is brutally raped and dumped in a store room.

Devlin has been looking at the bank tapes and see that some of the money the robbers took was not supposed to be there. The bank manager confesses it was payment for an (illegal) arms deal. A phone call shows Lind to be fake and he is shot while shooting his accomplice.

A hidden phone reveals to the hostages that one of the robbers was an undercover cop (who has been shot dead) who would have a second gun, which a young woman manages to get and hand to Sam.

There is a shoot out and dozens of bullets from each gun, with few hits. The cops rush in and the siege is over, but there is still a surprise ending.

Cast
 Edward Furlong as Sam
 Michael Madsen as Agent Lind
 Arnold Vosloo as Detective Rick Devlin
 Bai Ling as Nadia
 Jordana Spiro as Mary Jane
 Tamer Karadağlı as Duca
 Brandy Little as Alice
 Yelda Reynaud as Detective Catherine Pulliam
 Deniz Akkaya as Anne Noble
 Trent Haaga as Max
 Maurice Ripke as Bud
 John F. Beach as Hodges
 Curtis Wayne as Karl
 Libby Villari as Miriam
 Hayden Tweedie as Jenny
 Monica Dean as Detective Lascar
 Matthew Tompkins as Sergeant McCrea
 Brady Coleman as Harold
 Matthew Posey as Captain Burleson
 Ken Thomas as Officer Bishop
 Tom Zembrod as Bill
 Robin McGee as Mr. Gris
 Małgorzata Kożuchowska as Paulina
 Jason Hammond as Fred
 Marvin Frank Stone III as Uniformed Command Center Cop
 Brandon Baker as 21 Jump Baker
 Glenn Bradley as Officer Walker
 Mark Andrew Clark as Miami "Serpico" Clark
 Nicole Holt as Onlooker
 Todd Jenkins as Officer Smith
 Natalie Jones as Bank Teller
 Steve Krieger as Sharpshooter
 Yvonna Lynn as Officer Hardin
 Michael Magnus as News Cameraman
 Robert N. McLain as Officer Dalton
 Reece Rios as The Postman
 Marti Twombly as Officer Bonny

Producers
 Brandon Baker ....  producer
 Laszlo Bene ....  line producer
 Mark Andrew Clark ....  associate producer
 Elif Dağdeviren ....  executive producer
 Ron Gell ....  producer
 Nesim Hason ....  producer
 Sezin Hason ....  executive producer
 Bülent Helvacı ....  executive producer
 Jon Keeyes ....  producer

Production
Deniz Akkaya admitted that she had a hard time in the rape scene: "I saw the actors there for the first time. It was very difficult for me, but it ended in one shot. We didn't have to shoot it over and over."

References

External links
 
 
 Living & Dying Teaser Website
 Interview with director Jon Keeyes

2007 films
2000s crime thriller films
American crime thriller films
American heist films
2000s English-language films
2000s American films